Mohammed Tanko Ismaila (born 15 November 1988) is a Ghanaian footballer, who played club soccer in Spain and at home in Ghana.

Club career
Tanko won the 2009 H.P. Nyametei Cup final with Heart of Lions, scoring a goal in the second leg to help his team to victory.

He played professionally for CD Leganés and from January to June 2011 on loan for CD Teruel. On 9 June 2011 signed a contract for Medeama SC and returned to his native Ghana. He left Medeama in 2013 returning to Heart of Lions through 2016.

Tanko played for several clubs in the Ghana Premier League including Aduana Stars, where he signed in 2017. He was released from Elmina Sharks in January 2019 when the club lowered their wage bills.

International career
Tanko was a member of the Ghana national under-17 football team and Ghana national under-20 football team. Since 2009 he is member of the Ghana national football team.

Honours
 H.P. Nyametei/SWAG Cup 2009
 Ghana Premier League 2017

References 

1988 births
Living people
Ghanaian footballers
Association football forwards
Heart of Lions F.C. players
Medeama SC players
Elmina Sharks F.C. players